Sinner is a fantasy novel by Sara Douglass, the first novel in The Wayfarer Redemption Trilogy.  In the United States it is also considered the fourth in The Wayfarer Redemption sextet.  It is followed by Pilgrim and concludes in Crusader.

Plot summary
Axis chooses to leave the mortal world with his wife Azhure, leaving his son Caelum to rule as the Starson.

Matters worsen when Caelum finds himself engaging in affair with his sister Riverstar, who eventually becomes pregnant and threatens to blackmail her brother with this fact. 
The ancient and deadly WolfStar also returns to the world of Tencendor; seeking to cause the rebirth of his lover Niah within a powerful body. He selects Zenith as the perfect host, displacing her soul and replacing it with Niah's. However, WolfStar is not the only one to return; the newly empowered Faraday arrives and aids Zenith in expelling both Niah's soul and WolfStar's child from her body.

Meanwhile, Drago discovers an odd oasis in the universe outside the Star Gate, containing an insane Icarii woman, many children with the likeness of hawks and five dark and dangerous beings known as the Timekeepers who offer great power. This promise proves false however, when they steal Drago's life force and use it to shatter the Star Gate and destroy most of the world's magic in the process.

See also

Wayfarer Redemption

1997 Australian novels
1997 fantasy novels
Australian fantasy novels
Novels by Sara Douglass
HarperCollins books